Einar Stray Orchestra is a Norwegian indie-pop and post-rock band. The young quintet have released three albums to rave critics, two EP's, 
and have played more than 300 concerts in Europe/Asia. Combining classical 
and folk music with pop and rock they have played several sold-out 
headliner tours and festivals. Einar Stray Orchestra is influenced by bands such as Sufjan Stevens, Bright Eyes, and Godspeed You! Black Emperor.

History
Einar Stray started recording songs in his bedroom in Sandvika, a little town located in the south west of Oslo in 2006 and uploaded them to Myspace. As an experimental singer/songwriter he brought musician friends with 
him on stage, and together they produced music both delicate and 
grandiose with strings, blows, percussion, choir parts, noisy guitars, 
and a classical inspired piano style - counting 11 band members at its most.

After meeting the Norwegian artist Moddi in 2008, they quickly joined 
forces and released their debut EPs together, as a split-vinyl. "Favors 
And Fields/Rubato EP" resulted in their first tour through Norway, 
including big festivals like Slottsfjell, By:larm and Øya. Moddi and 
Einar has appeared in each other's bands ever since.

In 2011, the band got compressed into a five-piece, and released their debut album, Chiaroscuro, in Germany, Austria, Switzerland, Japan and Norway  of which Terese Blåklokke did the artwork.

With a range from noisy post-rock ballads to stripped down a cappella 
songs the band toured all of 2012, and gave also birth to "For The 
Country EP". They ended the year opening for Múm and Under Byen in 
Russia.

The second album Politricks was released in 2014  which had been rated by The Line of Best Fit as following:

“There's so much going on that it's difficult to glean much upon initial listens – it's probably a little alienating, but if you do manage to persevere and penetrate the gloopy outer shell, you'll be rewarded with an opulent, everchanging chimera of a record.”

It was Simen Sandbæk Skari of the band Team Me who did the artwork of this cover.

In May 2015 the band announced that they are working on their third album, coming out in 2016.

Discography

Albums
2011: Chiaroscuro (Nordic version - Spoon Train Audio)
2012: Chiaroscuro (European version - Sinnbus)
2014: Politricks (Riot Factory/Sinnbus)
2017: Dear Bigotry (Sinnbus)

EPs
2008: Favors And Fields (EP - Spoon Train Audio)
2012: For the Country (EP - Sinnbus)

References

Norwegian post-rock groups
Musical groups established in 2006